Jersey is a 2019 Indian Telugu-language sports drama film written and directed by Gowtam Tinnanuri and produced by Suryadevara Naga Vamsi under Sithara Entertainments. It stars Nani and Shraddha Srinath with Ronit Kamra, Sathyaraj, Harish Kalyan, Sanusha, Sampath Raj and Viswant Duddumpudi in pivotal roles. The film's music is composed by Anirudh Ravichander, whereas cinematography was handled by Sanu John Varghese and editing done by Naveen Nooli.

The film deals with late bloomers who want to aspire in sports, but face several complications. The storyline follows Arjun (Nani), a talented but failed cricketer who decides to return to cricket in his mid-30s, driven by the desire to represent the Indian cricket team, and fulfill his son's wish for a jersey as a gift. Principal photography of the film commenced on 18 October 2018 and was completed in late-March 2019.

Jersey was released worldwide on 19 April 2019, receiving universal acclaim and critical reviews with praise of direction, plot, screenplay, editing, music, score, emotional weight and cast performances (especially of Nani and Kamra). Several reviewers listed the film as one of the "Best Telugu films of 2019". Nani's performance in the film was highly appreciated by most critics, with Film Companion ranking his performance as one of his career's best and in the list of 100 Greatest Performances of the Decade. The film won two National Film Awards: Best Feature Film – Telugu and Best Editing (Nooli). It further won two Critics Choice, Zee Cine Awards Telugu and four South Indian International Movie Awards. The film was also screened at the International Indian Toronto Film Festival in August 2020. In 2022, Tinnanuri also helmed the Hindi remake of the film, sharing the same title.

Plot 
In 2019 in New York City, a young man buys a book called Jersey from a bookshop but gives it to a woman who came in to buy the book. When the woman asks for the reason why he gave her the book, the man replies that the book is on the life of his father, Arjun.

The man reserves a phone call and a lady from other side tell him that Board of Control for Cricket in India (BCCI) scheduled to facilitate, honour his father in a public event.

In the event in front of large gathering, where his mother and his father's friends, BCCI officials and former cricketers, the man, Nani tells his father's biography after receiving India national cricket team's jersey of his father, Arjun's name written on it.

In 1986 in Hyderabad, Arjun is an immensely talented Ranji (First-class cricketer) player who is in love with Sarah. Arjun quits cricket when he repeatedly gets rejected to play in the Indian team, due to selection politics. He is given a government job under sports quota, but loses it when he is accused of bribery.

10 years later in 1996, the 36-year-old Arjun is jobless and always scolded by his wife Sarah, for not consulting a lawyer to get his job back since he is innocent. Their seven-year-old son Nani, who plays for his school cricket team, asks Arjun for an Indian jersey. Arjun learns that the jersey costs , and despite not having the money, he promises his son that he will gift him the jersey for his birthday. Arjun finally consults a lawyer for losing his job, but is told that he cannot get his job back until he pays the lawyer. Left with no option, Arjun asks for money from his friends to buy the jersey but is not successful.

Arjun's ex-coach Murthy approaches him with a request to play in a charity match being planned between the Hyderabad cricket team and New Zealand. Arjun plays the match and gives a wonderful performance in the match, but falls just short of eking out a win. Afterwards, he learns that there is no match fee, being a charity match. A journalist, Ramya, is at the match and photographs Arjun's performance. When Nani pesters him for the jersey on the way home from the match, Arjun slaps him in a fit of frustration.

On realizing the depth of his son's love for him, Arjun decides to play cricket again. Assistant Coach Murthy is shocked at first but later supports him. Arjun attends the Hyderabad Ranji team selection trials and is dismissed by the Karnataka coach because of his age. Eventually, an article by Ramya convinces him and Mumbai coach Atul to give Arjun a chance. Based on some stellar performances as a batsman, he gets selected to play into the Ranji team, despite his age. Arjun starts representing the team and plays exceptionally good cricket. Despite his success, Sarah is not happy and wants him to quit cricket and return to his mundane existence as a food inspector. Seeing his performances, her estranged father meets her and offers to pay the 50,000 Rupee fee to the lawyer to restore Arjun's job. Arjun tells Sarah that he is constantly told he is unable to do anything, but now has rediscovered his true calling, expressing his fear and anger after hearing his wife's doubt in him. At the end of the semifinals, Arjun experiences chest pain but insists on playing through the match, delivering a win. Afterwards, his doctor advises him to get several tests done, which Sarah tells him they do not have the money to pay for. Arjun considers retiring from the team, but asks Nani if he should play or not, and his son encourages him to play. In the finals, when the Hyderabad team is stuck in a tough situation, Arjun single-handedly leads the team to victory, but he himself collapses soon after the match.

Back in 2019, the adult Nani (the man who bought the book at the beginning) and Sarah are invited to a felicitation ceremony of Arjun in a hotel. The book of Arjun's life was written by Ramya, the journalist who had followed Arjun's impossible journey when it originally happened. Nani gets a gift, the Indian jersey that was awarded to Arjun by the BCCI, as Arjun was selected to the Indian team based on his performance that year. Nani also talks emotionally that he had asked this to his father 23 years ago, and his love was so pure that his father kept his promise after so long. Nani reveals that Arjun had died in the hospital from heart failure 2 days after the Ranji finals. Nani learns from Arjun's doctor during a private conversation with him, at the ceremony to felicitate Arjun, that Arjun was suffering from a heart disease called Arrhythmia, causing an irregular heartbeat. Arjun had known about it when he was 26 years old, which the real reason why he had quit cricket, but never told anyone about it, including his wife. Nani reveals that Arjun was a true fighter who fought despite knowing the consequences contradicting his critics who labelled him as the one who perished while pursuing his dreams but in actuality, he was accomplishing his son's wishes to see his father as cricketer despite knowing that his death would be certain, imparting “it’s never too late to dream.”

Cast

Production

Development 
In June 2018, Nani was reported to sign his 23rd film with Gowtam Tinnanuri, who made his debut with Malli Raava (2018), which was officially announced at the second season of the Bigg Boss Telugu show, which commenced on 10 June 2018. A first look poster was released on 15 June 2018, revealing the title as Jersey. The poster featured a cricket jersey with the name "Arjun", who is a struggling 36 year old cricketer played by Nani in the lead role. The film was set up in the period of 1986 and 1996. Director Gowtam Tinnanuri noted that the film is not based on the life of late cricketer Raman Lamba.

The pre-production work of the film took place soon after its announcement, and makers decided to start the shoot in September 2018, only after finalising the cast and crew members. While Nani had undergone a special training in cricket, for three and half hours per day, to fit into his role. Followed by the success of Bigg Boss Season 2, Nani decided to increase the remuneration by  crore to  crore. However, Nani signed the film free of cost and also opting for a profit-sharing basis, due to major constraints in the film's budget.

Casting 
Anirudh Ravichander announced that he will be composing music for the project, which marks his second film in Telugu after Agnyaathavaasi. The technical crew also included Sanu John Vargehse, Naveen Nooli and Avinash Kolla as the cinematographer, editor and art director respectively. Initially Reba Monica John and Kashmira Pardeshi were roped in as the female leads for the film. Later, Shraddha Srinath was finalised to star opposite Nani. Shraddha claimed that the film's script based on sports is about "emotions and relationships". Harish Kalyan, Sathyaraj and Sampath Raj were signed in other prominent roles. While Adah Sharma was reported to act in a special song in the film, it was claimed as baseless rumours, since the actress did not confirm her presence.

Filming 
The film was launched on 17 October 2018, with the presence of the crew members, whilst Trivikram Srinivas attending the ceremony as the chief guest. Principal photography commenced the very following day, and was held at various places across Hyderabad. It was revealed that 250 cast and crew members were involved in the making of the film. The main cricket match that takes place in the film was apparently shot in 24 days on two international and five domestic cricket grounds. 130 professional cricket players were also roped in to be extras for these scenes, with 18 of them coming in from England. It was revealed that the shooting of the film was wrapped up in March 2019. Post-release the director had shot two climaxes for the film, however there was no change in the climax scene after Nani condemned rumours about the film.

Themes and analysis 
In an interview with The Indian Express, director Tinnanuri stated about the film's plotline which deals with late bloomers, who want to aspire in the sports field, but they face difficulties from doing so. He further added:

While some claimed that the film is based on the life of Raman Lamba, Nani and director Tinnanuri claimed that it is a fictional story.

Soundtrack 

The film's soundtrack album and background score were composed by Anirudh Ravichander in his second Telugu project after Agnyaathavaasi (2018). The album featuring five tracks had lyrics written by Krishna Kanth; four of the tracks were released as singles before the album release on 17 April 2019. Later, two of the tracks were released as bonus singles after the film's release – the first track "Aarambhame Le" was unveiled on 24 April and another track "Nuvvadiginadhe" was released along with the original background score on 13 May 2019.

Marketing and release 
The first look poster of the film was released on New Year's Eve, 31 December 2018. The official teaser of the film was released on 12 January 2019, and received praise for the portrayal of Nani's character as a cricketer in their mid-30s. On 9 March 2019, the movie team released a new poster, with resemblance to a magazine cover, which gained attention from film buffs. The official trailer of the film was released on 12 April 2019. The film's pre-release event was held at Shilpakala Vedika in Hyderabad on 15 April, with Venkatesh attending the event as the chief guest, in presence of the film's cast and crew.

The film received a U certificate from the Central Board of Film Certification without any cuts, and released worldwide on 19 April 2019. Although the film was expected to be released simultaneously in Tamil, the dubbed version was released on Sun NXT on 27 March 2021 as The Cricketer: My Dear Father. The film was also dubbed and released in Hindi on television and YouTube by Goldmines Telefilms on 13 October 2019.

Reception 
Jersey opened to universal acclaim with praise especially for Nani's performance, Tinnanuri's screenplay and emotional sequences. Neetishta Nyayapati of The Times of India gave 4 out of 5 stars stating "Jersey will make you laugh, cry and cheer out loud. A while into the film, Nani simply ceases to exist and it is only cricketer Arjun you see." The Indian Express gave 4 out of 5 stars stating "Not just drama, Jersey has enough cricketing moments to draw you to the edge of the seat. Gowtam exactly knows how much of cricket should be shown at a given point in the narration, so that the game doesn't overshadow the human drama." Writing for the Hindustan Times, Haricharan Pudipeddi gave 4 out of 5 stars stating "Jersey manages to showcase the cricket games as convincingly as possible. The effort that has gone into getting trained for his character is quite visible in Nani’s performance. From the stands to the shots and the follow through, Nani gets the body language of a batsman right and is a treat to watch while playing." Firstpost gave 4 out of 5 stars stating "Jersey packs in so many emotional moments that it'll leave you with a heavy heart and loads of tears. It's a blessing that this film exists in Telugu. Watch it, cherish it, and soak yourself in the world of Jersey. They don't make such films so often these days." Indiaglitz gave 3.5 out of 5 stars stating "'Jersey' is a stunning narration with touching scenes, honest rendition of dialogue, apt performances, and sound technical values.  A must watch film for daring to be different. Cricket lovers as well as family audiences will enjoy the ingredients."

Sify gave 3.5 out of 5 stars stating "Jersey is a refreshing and compelling sports drama and the film offers many heart-warming moments. Climax sequence is superb. Nani's brilliant performance, emotional scenes and honest narration makes this a good movie." Behindwoods gave the film a rating of 3.25 out of 5 and stated "Jersey is a layered sports drama with strong technical work, making it a must watch." 123 Telugu gave a rating of 3.5 out of 5 stars and wrote "Jersey is a realistic sports drama which moves you emotionally. Nani once again proves what an actor he is and single handedly takes the film to greater heights. Realistic narration, relatable characters, great performances and above all, honest emotions will make your heart heavy. If you ignore the slightly slow pace, this film will be liked by one and all and makes for a great watch as honest films like Jersey come rarely." Sangeetha Devi Dundoo of The Hindu, wrote "Gowtam Tinnanuri presents an endearing sports drama backed by strong performances."

Film Companion wrote "There are a few simple-yet-touching moments that safely put Jersey in a league of its own." India Today gave 3.5 out of 5 stars and wrote "Director Gowtam Tinnanuri's Jersey is not just your regular sports drama. It is an emotional film that talks about a disgruntled cricketer's life, his ever-supporting wife and what it is like to be back to doing what you once considered your life." Suresh Kavirayani of Deccan Chronicle gave 3.5 out of 5 stars and wrote "Keeping the best for last, Gowtam ends the film with a twist which enhances the tale." Sowmya Rajendran of The News Minute gave 4 out of 5 stars and wrote "The sports drama genre, be it fictional or biopics, is in vogue in Indian cinema. Gowtam Tinnanuri’s biggest challenge with Jersey, therefore, was to not sound too predictable. But the director pulls it off by choosing to tell a story about failure rather than success. Both Shraddha and Nani are terrific together, portraying two guilt-ridden people who don’t know how to bridge the widening gap between them."

Accolades

Remake 

Jersey has been remade in Hindi with the same title  by Tinnanuri himself, marking as his Hindi directorial debut and produced by Dil Raju, Allu Aravind and Aman Gill under Sri Venkateswara Creations and Geetha Arts. The film stars Shahid Kapoor and Mrunal Thakur.

Notes

References

External links 
 

2019 films
2010s Telugu-language films
Films directed by Gowtam Tinnanuri
Indian sports drama films
2010s sports drama films
Films about cricket in India
Films scored by Anirudh Ravichander
Films set in the 1980s
Films set in the 1990s
Films set in 1986
Films set in 1996
Films set in 2019
Films set in New York City
2019 drama films
Best Telugu Feature Film National Film Award winners